Admir Raščić (born 16 September 1981) is a Bosnian-Herzegovinian professional footballer who plays as a striker for Second League of FBiH - Center club NK Azot Vitkovići.

Club career
Born in Foča, SR Bosnia and Herzegovina, Raščić began his career playing with FK Željezničar Sarajevo in the Bosnian-Herzegovinian Premier League, often appearing upfront alongside a young Edin Džeko.

In summer 2006 he moved abroad and joined NK Bela Krajina in the Slovenian First League. At the end of the season he returned to Bosnia, only this time joining Željezničar city rivals FK Sarajevo who had just been crowned Bosnian champions the season before.  Admir Raščić had played 6 matches and scored on 3 occasions in Sarajevo's 2007–08 European campaign.  He played with them for one and a half seasons, until he moved, in the winter break of 2008–09, to Norway's Tippeligaen side Sandefjord Fotball.  He played for them in the 2009 and 2010 seasons.  In the first season they finished 8th, but in 2010 Sandefjord ended up being relegated.  During his two seasons in Norway, beside having played 34 league matches and scoring 3 goals, he also played with Sandefjord's second team for a total of 22 matches scoring 17 goals in the 2009 and 2010 Norwegian third tier.

In 2010 Admir Raščić was back in Bosnia, this time signing with Premier League side FK Olimpic Sarajevo.  After making 26 league appearances and scoring 8 goals, in the winter break of 2010–11 he moved abroad again, this time to Serbia by signing with a newly promoted SuperLiga side FK Novi Pazar.

Upon the advice of his former teammate and longstanding mentor, Alen Bajkuša, Raščić joined Hong Kong First Division League club Sun Pegasus on 11 July 2013. On 30 August 2013, Raščić scored on his debut for Sun Pegasus against Happy Valley; the match finished 3–0 to Sun Pegasus. On 26 October 2013, Raščić netted the first hat-trick of the 2013–14 Hong Kong First Division League season in a 6–0 home victory against Tuen Mun SA.  Unfortunately, the goals scored in both matches were later rescinded by the Hong Kong Football Association following its decision to disqualify Tuen Mun and Happy Valley from further participation in the league. Nevertheless, Raščić ended the season as the league's top goal scorer with 14 goals in 17 league appearances.  He also won the HKFA Fans' Favourite Player of the Year Award and was selected into the HKFA 2013–14 Hong Kong First Division League Team of the Year.
On 27 June 2015 Raščić returned to FK Olimpic to help them in their  Europa League Campaign.

In February 2017 Raščić signed for FK Goražde. After leaving Goražde in June 2017, in August 2018, 1 year later, he signed for Second League of FBiH - Center club NK Azot Vitkovići, where he later became manager.

International career
After being part of the Bosnian-Herzegovinian U-21 team in 2003, Admir Raščić made his debut for the main Bosnia and Herzegovina national football team in a February 2006 friendly match against Japan and earned a total of 2 caps, scoring no goals. His second and final international was a January 2008 friendly match against the same opposition.

Personal life
At the age of 10, Raščić fled to Germany with his brother and grandmother as a result of the conflict in Bosnia. He is married to Mirela, who was born on exactly the same day as Raščić. The couple have two children, son Ajdin and daughter Hannan. His younger brother, 38-year-old ex-footballer Almir Raščić, was shot dead on 23 January 2023.

Career statistics

Hong Kong
 As of 14 May 2015. The following table only shows statistics in Hong Kong.

1 All league and cup appearance(s) and goal(s) scored against Happy Valley and Tuen Mun have been discounted due to Hong Kong Football Association's decision to disqualify both teams from further participation in the league.

Honours
Club
Sun Pegasus
2013–14 Hong Kong First Division League Runners-up
2013–14 Hong Kong Senior Challenge Shield Runners-up

Individual
Hong Kong First Division League Top Goal Scorer: 2013–14
Hong Kong First Division League Fans' Favourite Player of the Year: 2013–14
Hong Kong First Division League Team of the Year: 2013–14
Hong Kong First Division League Monthly Most Valuable Player: September 2013, September 2014

References

External links

 
 
 Profile at Srbijafudbal
 Profile at Utakmica.rs
 

1981 births
Living people
People from Foča
Yugoslav Wars refugees
Association football forwards
Bosnia and Herzegovina footballers
Bosnia and Herzegovina under-21 international footballers
Bosnia and Herzegovina international footballers
FK Željezničar Sarajevo players
NK Bela Krajina players
FK Sarajevo players
Sandefjord Fotball players
FK Olimpik players
FK Novi Pazar players
FK Borac Banja Luka players
TSW Pegasus FC players
FK Goražde players
Premier League of Bosnia and Herzegovina players
Slovenian PrvaLiga players
Eliteserien players
Serbian SuperLiga players
Hong Kong Premier League players
Hong Kong First Division League players
First League of the Federation of Bosnia and Herzegovina players
Bosnia and Herzegovina expatriate footballers
Expatriate footballers in Slovenia
Bosnia and Herzegovina expatriate sportspeople in Slovenia
Expatriate footballers in Norway
Bosnia and Herzegovina expatriate sportspeople in Norway
Expatriate footballers in Serbia
Bosnia and Herzegovina expatriate sportspeople in Serbia
Expatriate footballers in Hong Kong
Bosnia and Herzegovina expatriate sportspeople in Hong Kong
Bosnia and Herzegovina football managers